Myotomys is a genus of African Karoo rats that inhabit the Karoo, a semi-desert region in the southern portion of the African continent.  Previously placed in the genus Otomys, they are sometimes referred to as vlei rats.

Species
Genus Myotomys
Sloggett's vlei rat (rock Karoo rat, ice rat), Myotomys sloggetti 
Bush vlei rat, Myotomys unisulcatus

References

 
Rodent genera
Taxa named by Oldfield Thomas